Open Dental, previously known as Free Dental, is an open source dental practice management software licensed under the GNU General Public License. It is written in the C# programming language compatible with Microsoft .NET Framework and was first released in 2003. Current versions of the software require Microsoft Windows, but earlier versions supported other operating systems, including Linux.  The full function version is only available under the commercial license because it includes royalty-bearing, licensed materials from the American Dental Association (ADA), the Code on Dental Procedures and Nomenclature (CDT).

Open Dental is owned and sponsored by Open Dental Software, Inc., an Oregon corporation. The company’s revenue comes from monthly technical support fees, required for the first 6 months of use. The first Open Dental customer bought technical support services on July 22, 2003.

Database
The database uses the dual-licensed MySQL database program. Both local preferences and those which apply to every computer in the office are stored in the MySQL database.

The database schema is published and publicly viewable.

Features

Appointment

Create unlimited operatories and unlimited providers.
Edit views, colors, default values.
Schedule and modify appointments.
Show pop-up alerts, financial and medical notes.
Recall scheduling.
Contact all patients on the days schedule from the appointment view.
See production by operatory.

Family

View patient records (HIPAA compliant).
When possible, fields are filled automatically or checked for potential errors.
Save billing type and insurance information.
Sign Procedure Notes: Digital Signatures. Sign or initial procedure notes using a Topaz signature pad or by using a stylus on a touchscreen.
Patient Info Terminal (Kiosk): A way for a new patient to enter their own information from the waiting room. The receptionist controls the terminal from another computer. Can also be used to let patient update their info if it has changed. New patients can check off items in list of conditions.
Track student status and referrals.
Track credit and contact notes.

Account

Send communication to patients. 
Email, text, or mail appointment or recare reminders.
Patient and Insurance billing system with e-claim functionality
E-claims: go through a clearinghouse to submit all e-claims or submit directly to carries that support the X12 files/claims. The X12 EDI Format is the standard defined by ASC (ex-ANSI) and specified by HIPAA. 
Track referrals and lab cases. 
Lab Cases: set up turnaround times on each procedure type for due dates to be calculated automatically.
Create and track payment plans.
View patient and family balances.
Credit Card Processing Integrated credit card processor with swipe terminal.

Treatment Plan

View/Edit/Save treatment plans.
Prioritize treatment.
Create multiple treatment plans.
Create planned appointments for treatment planned care.
Print or send electronically insurance preauthorization forms.

Chart

Enter and organize patient clinical information.
3D tooth charting with timeline to show treatment over time.
Track progress and treatment notes.
Supports paper and electronic prescribing.
Rx Alerts: Crosslink Diseases to Rx definitions so that an alert is triggered for allergies, etc. when writing an Rx.
Procedure codes: Currently, the following sets of procedure codes are available as separate databases: blank, usa, canada, uk.
Perio Charting: chart manually or using voice commands.

Images
Add and manage patient images.
Integrate with Radiography, scanner, digital camera devices.
Images can be zoomed in and out, rotated.
Import Word, PDF, and Excel files or scanned images.

Manage

Create and send e-claims or paper claims.
Billing automation.
Audio and visual office intercom.
Critical data backup.
User-defined queries and reports.
Track employee hours and breaks.
Daily, weekly & monthly task lists.
Built-in accounting intended to replace QuickBooks for small offices.
Secure remote access.
Language support: The code is all written to automatically adapt to the user's computer settings. The translations are specific to the culture (country), not just the language. 
Time Cards: User defined pay periods. Tracks 40-hour workweek, computes overtime, allows adjustments, and prints.
Multiple Server/Location Support.

eServices
 eClipboard eService and App (iOS and Android): patient check-in, patient forms, and patient picture using the practice's mobile device.
 eConfirmations: Send automated text message and/or email confirmations to remind patients about an upcoming appointment and allow the patient to e-confirm.
 eReminders: Send automated text message and/or email reminders about upcoming appointments.
 Integrated Texting: Send SMS text messages directly to patient's mobile devices and receive unlimited inbound text messages from patients.
 Mobile Web: Connect to the Open Dental database using a mobile device.
 Patient Portal: Give patients electronic access to their health information and use Secure Web Mail to send and receive patient information.
 Web Forms: Allow patients to complete forms online using any browser. Mobile Web Forms allow patients to complete forms using a mobile device.
 Web Sched New Patient: Allow new patients to schedule their first appointment online.
 Web Sched Recall: Automatically or manually email recall reminders that include a clickable link to schedule the appointment online. 
eRx: Write and transmit electronic prescriptions (only available in the United States and its territories, including Puerto Rico).

Awards
Best Dental Practice Management Software Provider 2018, Global Health & Pharma (GHP)

DrBicuspid.com 2017 Dental excellence Awards: Best New/Updated Software/Service

See also

 List of FLOSS healthcare programs

References

External links
 Open Dental Website
 MySQL Website
 Sourceforge Website
 ConvergedComm CRM plugin for OpenDental

FLOSS health care resources
Free software programmed in C Sharp
Dental practice management software
Healthcare software for Windows
Healthcare software for Linux